Mrs. Columbo (1979–1980), later called Kate Columbo, Kate the Detective, and Kate Loves a Mystery, is an American crime drama television series, initially based on the wife of Lieutenant Columbo, the title character from the television series Columbo. It was created and produced by Richard Alan Simmons and Universal Television for NBC, and stars Kate Mulgrew as a news reporter helping to solve crimes while raising her daughter.

The series debuted in February 1979 as a spin-off to the mystery crime drama series Columbo, focusing on Lieutenant Columbo's wife, who is never given a first name in the original Columbo series but was named Kate in this series. After poor ratings and reception from both audiences and the original producers of Columbo, both the series and the eponymous character herself were renamed in an attempt to change direction, but this did not help ratings and the series was ultimately canceled in March 1980 after 13 episodes had aired. Neither Peter Falk nor the character of Lieutenant Columbo ever appeared on the show; moreover, Falk never endorsed the show.

Series overview
Kate Columbo (later renamed Kate Callahan after an off-screen divorce) is the wife of Lieutenant Columbo, the title character from the television series Columbo. Kate is a news reporter who solves crimes while raising her daughter.

Cast
Kate Mulgrew as Kate Columbo / Kate Callahan
Lili Haydn as Jenny Columbo / Jenny Callahan
Henry Jones as Josh Alden
Don Stroud as Sergeant Mike Varrick

Production

Development
Shortly after the Columbo series ended its original run on NBC in 1978, despite objections from Columbo producers Richard Levinson and William Link, NBC executive Fred Silverman went forward in producing Mrs. Columbo as a spin-off to the original series. Levinson and Link further objected to Silverman's insistence on casting someone young to play the part; Kate Mulgrew was only 24 years old when the show made its debut. The information NBC released about the show was unambiguous about the fact that Mrs. Columbo in the new series was in fact the previously unseen wife frequently mentioned on Columbo.

Retooling
The show received poor ratings, however, and as part of efforts to revamp it, the linkage between this Kate Columbo and the Mrs. Columbo of the original television series was reduced. The name of the character was changed to Kate Callahan after an off-screen divorce, and the series was renamed Kate the Detective at the beginning of the second season, followed by Kate Loves a Mystery.

In this ultimate incarnation, the producers completed their retreat from the show's original premise, and Kate Callahan was then regarded as being a completely different character from Mrs. Columbo of Columbo, Kate's ex-husband now named Philip. None of the changes aided the new show's ratings, however, and it was pulled from the air in 1980, after 13 episodes.

Episodes

Season 1: 1979

Season 2: 1979–80

Reception
Peter Falk expressed his disapproval of the spin-off, calling it a "bad idea" and "disgraceful". When Columbo returned to the air in 1989 on ABC, it was further established that Lt. Columbo and his wife were still happily married, and the existence of the series Mrs. Columbo was effectively ignored.

Home media
The Mrs. Columbo episode "A Riddle for Puppets" was included as a bonus feature in the Region 1 DVD release of the fourth season of Columbo, released in August 2005. The episode "Murder Is a Parlor Game" was included in the third season of Columbo. The episode "Caviar with Everything" was included in the fifth season of Columbo.
Both seasons of Mrs. Columbo were released as a 5-disc set called Madame Columbo - Saisons 1 & 2 in France on October 22, 2014, by Universal and Elephant Films.

References

External links
 

1979 American television series debuts
1980 American television series endings
1970s American mystery television series
1980s American mystery television series
1970s American crime drama television series
1980s American crime drama television series
NBC original programming
Television series by Universal Television
American television spin-offs
American detective television series
Television shows set in Chicago
Columbo